The Rubens are an Australian alternative rock band from Menangle, New South Wales. The band comprises the three Margin brothers, Zaac, Sam and Elliott, and friends Scott Baldwin and William Zeglis. Their debut self-titled album The Rubens gained them domestic success with it reaching number 3 on the ARIA Charts and being nominated for a J Award for Album of the Year.

Band members
 Sammuel Margin – lead vocals, guitar
 Scott Baldwin – drums
 Elliott Margin – keyboards, backing vocals
 Izaac Margin – lead guitar
 William Zeglis – bass guitar

Career
In 2011, their debut single, "Lay It Down", was voted number 57 on the Triple J Hottest 100 of 2011. Their next single, "My Gun", was nominated for Best Music Video at the 2012 ARIA Awards and was voted number 10 on the Triple J Hottest 100 of 2012.

In May 2015, the band released the lead single from their second album, called "Hallelujah". The album, Hoops, was released in August 2015. The follow-up single from the album, the title track "Hoops", reached number 25 on the ARIA Singles Chart in 2015. It was also voted number 1 in the Triple J Hottest 100 of 2015, held on Australia Day 2016 (26 January). After its success on the Hottest 100, the single re-entered the charts, reaching a new peak of number 9 on the ARIA Singles Chart in February 2016.

In June 2018, the band released their third studio album, Lo La Ru, which became their third to debut within the ARIA top 5. In the same year, the band supported Pink in her 46-show tour of Australia.

In February 2021, the band released their fourth studio album, 0202. It debuted at number 1 on the ARIA Albums Chart, becoming the band's first album to do so.

Discography

Studio albums

Live albums

Extended plays

Singles

Promotional singles

Other charted songs

Awards and nominations

AIR Awards
The Australian Independent Record Awards (colloquially known as the AIR Awards) is an annual awards night to recognise, promote and celebrate the success of Australia's Independent Music sector.

! 
|-
! scope="row"| 2012
| Themselves
| Breakthrough Independent Artist of the Year
| 
| 
|-
! scope="row"| 2013 
| Themselves
| Breakthrough Independent Artist of the Year
| 
| 
|-
! scope="row"|  2022
| 0202
| Best Independent Pop Album or EP
| 
| 
|}

ARIA Music Awards
The ARIA Music Awards is an annual awards ceremony that recognises excellence, innovation, and achievement across all genres of Australian music. The Rubens have been nominated for four awards.

! 
|-
! scope="row"| 2012
| "My Gun" 
| Best Video
| 
| 
|-
! scope="row" rowspan="2"| 2013
| rowspan="2"| The Rubens
| Breakthrough Artist – Release
| 
| rowspan="2"| 
|-
| Best Rock Album
| 
|-
! scope="row"| 2020
| "Live in Life"
| Song of the Year
|  
| 
|-
! scope="row" rowspan="3"| 2021
| rowspan="2"| Konstantin Kersting for The Rubens – 0202 and "Masterpiece"
| Producer of the Year
| 
| rowspan="3"| 
|-
| rowspan="2"| Engineer of the Year
| 
|-
| Eric J Dubowsky for The Rubens – 0202
| 
|}

APRA Awards
The APRA Awards are held in Australia and New Zealand by the Australasian Performing Right Association to recognise songwriting skills, sales and airplay performance by its members annually. The Rubens have won two awards.

! 
|-
! scope="row" rowspan="2"|  2013
|rowspan="2"| "My Gun"
| Rock Work of the Year
| 
|  
|-
| Song of the Year
| 
| 
|-
! scope="row"| 2016
| "Hoops"
| Rock Work of the Year
| 
| 
|-
! scope="row"| 2017
| "Hold Me Back"
| Rock Work of the Year
| 
|  
|-
! scope="row" rowspan="2"| 2019
| "Never Ever" 
| rowspan="2"| Rock Work of the Year
| 
| rowspan="2"| 
|-
| "Million Man"
| 
|-
! scope="row"| 2020
| "God Forgot"
| Most Performed Alternate Work of the Year
| 
| 
|-
! scope="row" rowspan="2"| 2021
| rowspan="2"| "Live in Life" 
| Most Performed Alternative Work
| 
| rowspan="2"| 
|-
| Most Performed Australian Work
| 
|-
! scope="row"| 2022
| "Masterpiece"
| Most Performed Alternate Work of the Year
| 
| 
|-
|}

J Award
The J Awards are an annual series of Australian music awards that were established by the Australian Broadcasting Corporation's youth-focused radio station Triple J.

! 
|-
! scope="row" rowspan="2"| 2012
| The Rubens 
| Album of the Year
| 
| rowspan="2"| 
|-
| Themselves
| Unearthed Artist of the Year
| 
|-
! scope="row"| 2015
| Hoops 
| Album of the Year
| 
| 
|}

MTV Europe Music Awards
The MTV Europe Music Awards are a series of awards presented by Viacom International Media Networks to honour artists and music in pop culture.

! 
|-
! scope="row"| 2018
| Themselves
| Best Australian Act
| 
| 
|}

References

External links
 
 

2011 establishments in Australia
APRA Award winners
Australian alternative rock groups
Australian indie rock groups
Ivy League Records artists
Musical groups established in 2011
New South Wales musical groups